Aloe Vera is a 2020 Ghanaian film produced by Manaa Abdallah and Anny Araba Adams as co-produced and directed by Peter Sedufia.

Plot
Two groups of people live in the same village, the Aloes and the Veras. There is a harsh rivalry between them that endures even with the children and each side is marked by their own trademark color. When the children of the town leaders', Aloewin and Veraline, fall in love they must find a way to bring the two communities together despite the animosity. The community later on become one as result of the relationship between the two.

Cast

Production
The film's title was announced in 2019, alongside an announcement that director Peter Sedufia was constructing 100 homes in order to create a village for filming in the Dabala, Volta region of Ghana. Actors Priscilla Opoku Agyemang, Nana Ama Mcbrown, and Roselyn Ngissah were also named as performing in the movie. Worlasi was brought on to provide the film's soundtrack. Sedufia has described the movie as an "upgrade of his previous project and it is designed to give people something worth their money and time."

Aloe Vera had a budget of approximately N58,204,500 but went over budget at N77,606,000 due to extended filming dates after heavy rains damaged filming equipment. The rains also heavily damaged the film set, which Sedufia stated proved to be a major challenge.

Release 
Aloe Vera premiered in Ghana on March 6, 2020 in Accra. A trailer was released to promote the film and Glitz Africa wrote that "Enveloped with a stellar cast as well as opted blue and yellow costumes that give viewers a fair understanding of the story line governing the film, ‘Aloe Vera’ reveals a situation of tribal discrimination causing two young adults drowned in the rivers of love not to be together." Tickets for the premiere sold out quickly and GhanaWeb has credited the film's social media campaign for its success with moviegoers.

Later that same year Sedufia announced that the movie would have a digital release on Netflix.

Reception 
Citinewsroom reviewed Aloe Vera, writing that "‘Aloe Vera’s’ heart is there for everyone to see, and it’s definitely in the right place. The screenplay has the weight of a feather and it isn’t moving any narrative mountains. But the predictability doesn’t stop it from being the feel-good hit I didn’t see coming."

References

External links
 
 Review at Ghana Movie Freak

2020 films
2020 drama films
Ghanaian drama films
2020s English-language films
English-language Ghanaian films